"Stand by Me" is a song originally performed in 1961 by American singer-songwriter Ben E. King and written by him, along with Jerry Leiber and Mike Stoller, who together used the pseudonym Elmo Glick. According to King, the title is derived from, and was inspired by, a spiritual written by Sam Cooke and J. W. Alexander called "Stand by Me Father," recorded by the Soul Stirrers with Johnnie Taylor singing lead. 

It was featured on the soundtrack of the 1986 film of the same name, and a corresponding music video, featuring King along with actors River Phoenix and Wil Wheaton, was released to promote the film. It was also featured in a 1987 European commercial of Levi's 501 jeans, contributing to greater success in Europe. In 2012, its royalties were estimated to have topped $22.8 million (£17 million), making it the sixth highest-earning song as of its era. 50% of the royalties were paid to King. In 2015, King's original version was inducted into the National Recording Registry by the Library of Congress, as "culturally, historically, or aesthetically significant", just under five weeks before his death. Later in the year, the 2015 lineup of the Drifters recorded it in tribute.

There have been over 400 recorded versions of the song, performed by many artists, notably Otis Redding, John Lennon, Cassius Clay (later Muhammad Ali), 4 the Cause, Tracy Chapman, musicians of the Playing for Change project, Florence and the Machine, and the Kingdom Choir.

History and production

In 1960, Ben E. King was inspired to update the early 20th-century gospel hymn "Stand by Me" by Charles Albert Tindley, which was based on psalm 46, "will not we fear, though the Earth be removed, and though the mountains be carried into the midst of the sea."

According to the documentary History of Rock 'n' Roll, King had no intention of recording the song himself. King had written it for the Drifters, who passed on recording it. After the "Spanish Harlem" recording session in 1960, King had some studio time left over. The session's producers, Jerry Leiber and Mike Stoller, asked if he had any more songs. King played it on the piano for them. They liked it and called the studio musicians back in to record it.

Stoller recalls it differently: 
I remember arriving at our office as Jerry and Ben were working on lyrics for a new song. King had the beginnings of a melody that he was singing a cappella. I went to the piano and worked up the harmonies, developing a bass pattern that became the signature of the song. Ben and Jerry quickly finished the lyrics ... .

In another interview, Stoller said:
Ben E. had the beginnings of a song—both words and music. He worked on the lyrics together with Jerry, and I added elements to the music, particularly the bass line. To some degree, it's based on a gospel song called "Lord Stand By Me". I have a feeling that Jerry and Ben E. were inspired by it. Ben, of course, had a strong background in church music. He's a 50% writer on the song, and Jerry and I are 25% each.... When I walked in, Jerry and Ben E. were working on the lyrics to a song. They were at an old oak desk we had in the office. Jerry was sitting behind it, and Benny was sitting on the top. They looked up and said they were writing a song. I said, "Let me hear it."... Ben began to sing the song a cappella. I went over to the upright piano and found the chord changes behind the melody he was singing. It was in the key of A. Then I created a bass line. Jerry said, "Man that's it!" We used my bass pattern for a starting point and, later, we used it as the basis for the string arrangement created by Stanley Applebaum.

The personnel on the song included Romeo Penque on sax, Ernie Hayes on piano, Al Caiola and Charles McCracken on guitars, Lloyd Trotman on double bass, Phil Kraus on percussion, and Gary Chester on drums, plus a wordless mixed chorus and strings. Songwriting credits on the single were shown as King and Elmo Glick—a pseudonym used by Leiber and Stoller.

King's record went to number 1 on the R&B charts and was a Top Ten hit on the US charts twice—in its original release, entering the Billboard chart on May 13, 1961 and peaking at number 4 on June 16, 1961, and a 1986 re-release coinciding with its use as the theme song for the film of the same name following its appearance in the film, when it peaked at number 9 on December 20, 1986 – January 3, 1987. The song is also heard in the televised advertisement of Levi's 501 jeans. In the commercial, a man wearing a black denim jeans is able to enter a nightclub whose policy is "no blue jeans". "Stand by Me" also topped the charts in Canada, Ireland, and the United Kingdom upon its re-release. In the latter country, the song topped the UK Singles Chart in January 1987, mostly because of the jeans TV commercial, originally peaking at number 27 on the UK Singles Chart on its original release in Britain in 1961.

The song was not released on an album until it had been out as a single for two years. The song appeared on King's Don't Play That Song! album.

The song was ranked 122nd on Rolling Stone's list of the 500 Greatest Songs of All Time. In 1999, BMI named it as the fourth most-performed song of the 20th century, with about seven million performances.

On March 27, 2012, the Songwriters Hall of Fame announced that the song would receive its 2012 Towering Song Award and that King would be honored with the 2012 Towering Performance Award for his recording of it. In February 2019, the Smooth Radio network in the United Kingdom called it one "of the best love songs of the 1960s".

Structure
The song uses a version of the common chord progression now called the '50s progression, which has been called the "'Stand by Me' changes" after the song.

Chart performance
For the year-end charts in the US, the song was the number 63 song of 1961 and number 67 of 1987.

Weekly charts

Year-end charts

All-time charts

Certifications and sales

John Lennon version

John Lennon recorded his version of the song for his 1975 album Rock 'n' Roll. Lennon's remake became a single three weeks after the album's release and was his last hit prior to his five-year retirement from the music industry. Lennon filmed a performance of the song for The Old Grey Whistle Test in 1975.  Cash Box said of it that "John's serenading guitar chords herald this bright new production of one of rockdom's favorites," and that it displays Lennon's "magical, mysterious voice...at his finest."

On the week of May 3, 1975, this version was in its second of two weeks at the peak position number 20 on the US Hot 100, right in front of King's comeback hit "Supernatural Thing – Part I" at number 21.  Both tunes fell off the top 40 the next week and off the chart the week after that. Lennon's version stayed on top 100 of the UK Singles Chart for seven weeks, peaking at number 30 on its fourth week on the week of May 18–24, 1975. It peaked at number 13 on Canada's RPM Top Singles chart on the week ending May 3, 1975 and stayed on the peak position the following week. It peaked at number 11 on the Official New Zealand Music Chart on the week of July 14, 1975.

The single's B-side track is "Move Over Ms. L", initially intended for Lennon's previous album Walls and Bridges but was cut from the final lineup due to his dissatisfaction with his early takes. Keith Moon covered "Move Over Ms. L" for his 1975 solo album Two Sides of the Moon.

Before the parent album's official release, during Lennon's March 1974 sessions with Harry Nilsson for Nilsson's album Pussy Cats, Lennon recorded two takes of the song in collaboration with former Beatles member Paul McCartney. McCartney performed on the drums; Lennon on guitar. The unreleased recordings would eventually be included in a bootleg album A Toot and a Snore in '74.

Billboard regarded Lennon's version as "the best version since the original." Pitchfork writer Marc Hogan found Lennon's version "more affecting (just barely)" than the original due to the "acoustic guitar and Lennon's fervent vocals". A 2007 book The Words and Music of John Lennon by Ben Urish and Ken Bielen called Lennon's version one of the "stronger" tracks of the album. Journalist and book author Robert Webb in 2013 called this version one of the "greatest cover versions".

Personnel 
Personnel per John Lennon Website
 John Lennon - vocals, acoustic guitar
 Jesse Ed Davis, Peter Jameson – electric guitar
 Eddie Mottau – acoustic guitar
 Ken Ascher – piano
 Klaus Voormann – bass guitar
 Joseph Temperly, Frank Vicari – saxophone
 Dennis Morouse – tenor saxophone
 Jim Keltner – drums
 Arthur Jenkins – percussion

Mickey Gilley version

Mickey Gilley released his version of the song in 1980, and it was included in the movie Urban Cowboy. It was his eighth No. 1 on the US country charts and also reached No. 22 on the US Hot 100. This version also peaked at No. 3 in Canadian RPM Country Singles in September 1980 and No. 51 in RPM Top Singles the following month. The song would "become one of Gilley's signature songs."

Playing for Change version

Documentary filmmaker Mark Johnson, who also created the Playing for Change project based on an idea he had in the late 1990s and established the eponymous Foundation, witnessed street performer Roger Ridley (died November 16, 2005) singing "Stand by Me" in Santa Monica, California, in March 2005. 

Johnson was inspired to film Ridley's performance and another thirty-six musicians' individual performances of the song "around the world" and then mix the clips into one music video. The music video was featured in an October 2008 episode of Bill Moyers Journal, where Johnson was promoting the documentary film Playing for Change: Peace Through Music, which includes the music video and was shown as part of the 2008 Tribeca Film Festival in New York City. The music video was uploaded via the Playing for Change YouTube channel in November 2008, garnering more than 10 million views in May 2009. The total amount of views of the YouTube video increased to more than 24 million in December 2010, 30 million in March 2011, 40 million in March 2012, 50 million in some time between 2012 and 2014, 60 million in 2014, 74 million in May 2015, 100 million in 2017, and 140 (or 142) million in March 2020.

The musicians' performance of the song would be later included in their 2009 debut album Songs Around the World. The debut album has nine other tracks, comes with the seven-track bonus DVD, and sold about 26,000 units on its first week, 85% of sales from online sales and "nontraditional retail stores (including Starbucks locations)" and 25% from outside the United States.

Prince Royce version

Prince Royce recorded a bachata version of the song as his debut single, changing parts of the lyrics into Spanish. This version peaked number eight on US Hot Latin Tracks and number one on US Tropical Airplay. At the Latin Grammy Awards of 2010, Royce performed the song live along with Ben E. King. Royce's remake received a Lo Nuestro award for "Tropical Song of the Year". 

Royce performed the song live again at a July 2016 Philips Arena concert in Atlanta, Georgia alongside a male fan, at a 2017 Amway Center concert in Orlando, Florida, as the second song for the 2019 RodeoHouston concert, and at the third night of the 2020 Democratic National Convention. He also made a dance version for his debut album as well.

Other notable versions

1960s and 1970s
Adriano Celentano's 1962 Italian version, "Pregherò" (meaning "I will pray") reached number 1 on the Italian charts. Muhammad Ali (as Cassius Clay) released a version on his 1963 spoken-word/comedy album I Am the Greatest. Clay's recording was released as the B-side of the eponymous single in 1964, charting on the Billboard "Bubbling Under Hot 100 Singles". It was included on the CD Beat Of The Pops Vol 34.

Otis Redding covered the song for his 1964 debut album Pain in My Heart; Kenny Lynch's 1964 version stayed on the top 100 UK Singles Chart for seven weeks, peaking at number 39 on the week of May 7–13, 1964, its fourth week. Spyder Turner's 1967 version climbed to number 3 on the US Billboard Black Singles chart, number 12 on the Billboard Hot 100 chart, and number 10 in Canada.

David and Jimmy Ruffin (credited as The Ruffin Brothers) remade the song for their only collaborative album I Am My Brother's Keeper (1970). Released as a single, the version stayed at its peak position number 61 on Billboard Hot 100 for two weeks on the weeks ending November 28 (its sixth week) and December 5, 1970 (seventh week). It also peaked at number 24 on Billboard Soul Singles on the week ending November 21, 1970, its fourth week.

1980s

Maurice White's 1985 cover from his self titled album reached No. 6 on the US Billboard Hot R&B/Hip-Hop Singles chart  and No. 11 on the US Billboard Adult Contemporary Songs chart. White's version also topped at No. 5 on the RPM Canadian Adult Contemporary Songs chart and No. 8 on the New Zealand Singles chart.

Julian Lennon, son of John Lennon, performed the song at a spring 1985 concert, seen in the 1985 home video release Stand by Me: A Portrait of Julian Lennon. This version later appeared on the soundtrack to the 1986 film, Playing for Keeps. U2 performed the song with Bruce Springsteen at the John F. Kennedy Stadium (Philadelphia) concert on September 25, 1987, during the Joshua Tree Tour.

Anita Mui recorded the Cantonese version for her 1987 Cantonese album Mung Leui Gung Tseui. In 1988, Mui's version was awarded as one of top ten gold songs by Hong Kong telecommunication stations RTHK and by TVB. After Mui's death in 2003, Hong Kong singers and actors Miriam Yeung, Denise Ho, Alex To, Edmond Leung, band members of Grasshopper, Andy Hui, and William So performed Mui's version at Anita Mui. 10. Memory. Music. Gather., the December 30, 2013, tribute concert for Mui.

1990s
In a 1995 music video entitled Disney's Timon & Pumbaa in "Stand by Me", Timon performs the song with slightly altered lyrics, while every time Timon sings the chorus, Pumbaa survives physical mishaps and ferocious creatures. A trio of frogs then finish the song at the end. It's the only media in the series to use digital ink and paint. It was shown before Tom and Huck in theaters.

A version of the song was released by American R&B group 4 the Cause as their debut single in 1998. It was a number-one hit in Switzerland, reached number two of the Austrian and German singles charts and number three in New Zealand, and was a top-ten hit in several other countries.

2010s

Florence and the Machine recorded the song for the soundtrack and trailer of Final Fantasy XV in 2016. The band released its EP Songs from Final Fantasy XV on August 12, 2016, containing the band's remake. The cover peaked at number fifteen on the Billboard Hot Rock Singles in December 2016. In February 2017, voice actors of Final Fantasy XV Ray Chase (Noctis), Adam Croasdell (Ignis), Robbie Daymond (Prompto), and Max Mittelman (Tredd Furia of the 2016 film Kingsglaive: Final Fantasy XV) performed King's song all together while streaming their FFXV playthrough in a Twitch livestream video, viewed by almost 800 users.

Skylar Grey recorded the song which appeared for a Budweiser commercial for Super Bowl LII, with proceeds for the song to go to the American Red Cross.

The Kingdom Choir performed the song at the wedding of Prince Harry and Meghan Markle on May 19, 2018. Their version debuted and peaked at number one on the Billboard Hot Gospel Songs chart on the week ending June 2, 2018. It also entered the UK Singles Chart and peaked at number 94 on its first and only week, the week of May 25–31, 2018. It is included in their debut album, Stand by Me, released later that year.

2020s

On October 24, 2021, Snoop Dogg performed the song alongside the audience at a Big Night Live concert in Boston as a tribute to his mother Beverly Tate, who died at age 70 earlier on the same night.

Charts

Maurice White

4 the Cause

Certifications (4 the Cause)

Florence + the Machine

The Kingdom Choir

See also
 List of number-one R&B singles of 1961 (U.S.)
 List of UK Singles Chart number ones
 List of number-one singles of 1987 (Ireland)
 List of number-one Billboard Hot Tropical Songs of 2010

References

External links

1960 songs
1961 singles
1975 singles
1980 singles
1985 singles
1998 debut singles
2010 debut singles
Songs written by Jerry Leiber and Mike Stoller
Soul ballads
Bachata songs
Songs written by Ben E. King
Song recordings produced by John Lennon
Song recordings produced by Jim Ed Norman
Song recordings produced by Sergio George
Ben E. King songs
John Lennon songs
Otis Redding songs
Mickey Gilley songs
Prince Royce songs
Jay and the Americans songs
Florence and the Machine songs
RPM Top Singles number-one singles
UK Singles Chart number-one singles
Irish Singles Chart number-one singles
Number-one singles in Switzerland
Atco Records singles
Apple Records singles
Epic Records singles
Columbia Records singles
RCA Records singles
Island Records singles
Spanglish songs
The Walker Brothers songs
Top Stop Music singles
United States National Recording Registry recordings
Final Fantasy music
1960s ballads
Kenny Lynch songs